Ateleopus is a genus of ray-finned fish in the jellynose family Ateleopodidae. It is the type genus of its family, and the order Ateleopodiformes. For some time, it was known as Podateles, because Ateleopus had been used to replace the frog genus name Atelopus, which was deemed to be a spelling error. This was mistaken, however, and the fish and frog genera reverted to their original names.

This genus occurs in the fossil record since the mid-Miocene.

Species
There are currently 4 recognized species in this genus. Several other species have been described, but these are synonyms.

 Ateleopus edentatus Kaga, 2016
 Ateleopus indicus Alcock, 1891
 Ateleopus japonicus Bleeker, 1854 (Pacific jellynose fish)
 Ateleopus natalensis Regan, 1921 (Jelly-head fish)
Ateleopus purpureus Tanaka, 1915
Ateleopus tanabensis Tanaka, 1918

References

Ateleopodiformes
Extant Miocene first appearances